Greta Van Fleet is an American rock band from Frankenmuth, Michigan, formed in 2012. It consists of Kiszka brothers Josh (vocals), Jake (guitar) and Sam (bass guitar, keyboards); and Danny Wagner (drums). They were signed to Lava Records in March 2017, and a month later they released their debut studio EP, Black Smoke Rising. Their debut single, "Highway Tune", topped the Billboard U.S. Mainstream Rock and Active Rock charts in September 2017 for four weeks in a row. Their second EP, From the Fires, containing the four songs from Black Smoke Rising and four new songs, was released on November 10, 2017, alongside a second single, "Safari Song". From the Fires went on to win the 2019 Grammy Award for Best Rock Album.

Their debut full-length studio album, Anthem of the Peaceful Army, was released on October 19, 2018, and topped the Billboard Rock Album charts in the first week after its release. The album's first single, "When the Curtain Falls", was released ahead of it in July 2018 and became the band's third number-one single on the U.S. Billboard Mainstream Rock charts. Anthem of the Peaceful Army also debuted atop the Billboard Hard Rock charts and reached the number one spot on the Billboard Top Album Sales charts in the first week after its release. A second studio album, The Battle at Garden's Gate, was released on April 16, 2021.

History

Formation and early years (2012–2015)
The band was formed in Frankenmuth, Michigan, in 2012 by twin brothers Josh and Jake Kiszka, their younger brother Sam, and Kyle Hauck. Creating a band had always been Jake Kiszkas's dream, and he joined his high school band to further goal, where he eventually met Hauck, where he recruited him to start the band. Practicing music together in the Kiszka's family garage lead to the two eventually recruiting their brother's Josh and Sam to participate and later form the band. The band name was created when Kyle Hauck heard a relative mention Gretna Van Fleet, a resident of Frankenmuth; their use of the variation on her name was done with her (subsequent) blessing. Van Fleet also stated in a later interview that while the band's music is not her type, she supports the band and thinks they are very talented. At the time Hauck was the drummer, the band recorded three songs: "Cloud Train", "Highway Tune" and "Standing On". Hauck was forced to leave the band in October 2013 and was replaced as drummer by the brothers' good friend Danny Wagner the same year. The initial guitar riff for "Highway Tune" was cited by guitarist Jake Kiszka as being written as early as 2010. The song was re released as a single in March 2017. On February 28, 2014, a live EP was recorded in one take and released on June 7, 2014.

In March 2014, their song "Standing On" was featured in 2014 Chevy Equinox advertisements in the Detroit area. "Standing On" is one of several songs, along with "By the Riverside", "Cloud Train", "Down to the River", "Motown Funk No. 4", "Sing in the Rain", "Thunder Stomp", "Occidentali", and "Written in Gold", that were previously released but are currently unavailable.

Black Smoke Rising and From the Fires (2016–2017)
On January 17, 2016, the song "Highway Tune" was featured as a live performance by the band on the Showtime show Shameless. On March 31, 2017, the final recorded version of "Highway Tune" was released on iTunes as the band's first official single. On April 2, 2017, iTunes started streaming the song "Highway Tune". On April 18, 2017, the music video for the song "Highway Tune" was released exclusively on Loudwire. The band's debut EP titled Black Smoke Rising was released April 21, 2017. On April 21, 2017, Apple Music named Greta Van Fleet new artist of the week. The band toured with The Struts during May 2017.

In October 2017, the band won Best New Artist at the Loudwire Music Awards. The band released an eight-song double EP titled From the Fires on November 10, 2017. In addition to the four tracks from Black Smoke Rising, From the Fires features the new recordings "Edge of Darkness" and "Talk on the Street", as well as covers of Sam Cooke's "A Change Is Gonna Come" and Fairport Convention's "Meet on the Ledge". The four new tracks were recorded in September 2017 at Rustbelt Studios in Royal Oak, Michigan and produced by Al Sutton and Marlon Young, the same duo that produced Black Smoke Rising. The band also released "Safari Song" as a single in October 2017.

Greta Van Fleet opened for fellow Michigan native Bob Seger at the Dow Event Center in Saginaw, Michigan (just minutes from their hometown) on September 7. In November 2017, the band announced that they would begin recording their first full-length studio album shortly after the release of From the Fires, and that they expected its release by mid-2018.

Anthem of the Peaceful Army (2018–2019)
The band performed at Elton John's Academy Award Party on March 4, 2018, at the host's personal request. John joined Greta Van Fleet onstage for his "Saturday Night's Alright for Fighting" and their "You're the One". After the set Elton John recommended the band get more dramatic and flamboyant with their performance and wardrobe. On July 26, 2018, the band made their TV debut on The Tonight Show Starring Jimmy Fallon performing "When the Curtain Falls", the first single off of their upcoming debut album.

Their debut album, Anthem of the Peaceful Army, was released on October 19, 2018. According to Josh Kiszka, the name of the album "Anthem of the Peaceful Army" was taken from the title of a poem. It was the top selling album in its debut week in the US, selling 80,000 copies. Factoring in album equivalent units, it debuted at number three on the Billboard 200.

In December 2018, the band was nominated for four Grammy Awards – Best New Artist, Best Rock Performance for "Highway Tune", Best Rock Song for "Black Smoke Rising", and Best Rock Album for From the Fires, the latter of which they won.

On January 19, 2019, Greta Van Fleet appeared as a musical guest on Saturday Night Live, and performed the song "Black Smoke Rising" and second single from Anthem of the Peaceful Army "You're the One". A third single, "Lover, Leaver" was later released in May 2019. The band contributed "Always There", an outtake from the album, to the soundtrack of the film A Million Little Pieces.

Jake and Sam Kiszka told New Musical Express magazine in an interview in July 2019 that they are working on a new album to put out in the coming year and that their musical style has evolved.

The Battle at Garden's Gate (2020–present)
On October 9, 2020, the band released a new single, "My Way, Soon", accompanied by a music video that was shot, edited and directed by the band. The song was expected to appear on their upcoming second album, which, according to Wagner, drew on the band's touring over the previous two years, and how it opened their eyes: "We realized that while growing up, we had been shielded by a lot of things, we were unaware of a lot of things". On December 4, 2020, the band announced their second studio album would be titled The Battle at Garden's Gate. A single titled "Age of Machine" was also released alongside the announcement. The album was released on April 16, 2021. On February 10, 2021, the band released the third single "Heat Above". On March 19, 2021, the band released the fourth single "Broken Bells". The band then toured extensively throughout 2021 and 2022 on the global "Dreams in Gold" tour. In the July 16-22 tracking period, Greta Van Fleet earned 7.6 million U.S. on-demand streams of its catalog, a boost of 122%, according to MRC Data. Additionally, the rockers racked up 6,000 digital downloads of its songs, up 461%, and 5,000 album sales, up 86%.

Musical style and influences

Greta Van Fleet's music has been categorized as hard rock, blues rock, and progressive rock. Although all four members bonded over blues, each does have his own musical tastes: Jake gravitates towards rock and roll, Sam likes jazz, Danny prefers folk, and Josh likes world music. Jake said in an interview, "that all three brothers had listened to their parents' vinyl which included blues and folk music." Sam stated that, "It's not like we set out to be a rock and roll band, it's just that sound that comes out [when] we get together and play." Songwriting is done by the band as a whole after one of the four members finds the concept for a song. Danny stated that a lot of their songs are first written in a "folk set up" before evolving into something else.

Greta Van Fleet is often compared to Led Zeppelin. Jake related that he "... went through a year of really intensely studying what [Jimmy] Page did to the point I knew how he thought." He has also studied other classic rock guitarists in a similar manner, specifically mentioning Pete Townshend. Likewise, on his voice being compared to Robert Plant's, Josh said that Plant has certainly been an influence, "though it's not what I was going for." Stating that he did not even know who Led Zeppelin were until high school, he explained that his singing style came out naturally one day while struggling to be heard over the rest of the band. In a March 2018 interview, Plant said of Greta Van Fleet, "they are Led Zeppelin I" and described Josh as "a beautiful little singer."

Some of Jake's guitar influences include John Lee Hooker, Elmore James, Bert Jansch, Eric Clapton and Keith Richards. Some of the drummers that inspired Danny are Carmine Appice, John Bonham, Mitch Mitchell and Michael Shrieve. Sam's favorite bass player is Motown session bassist James Jamerson. Josh Kiszka has imitated the movements and onstage antics of Joe Cocker. According to guitarist Robby Krieger, the group has been also inspired by his band the Doors.

Members

Current
Josh Kiszka – lead vocals 
Jake Kiszka – guitars, backing vocals 
Sam Kiszka – bass guitar, keyboards, backing vocals 
Danny Wagner – drums, backing vocals 

Former
Kyle Hauck – drums

Discography

 Anthem of the Peaceful Army (2018)
 The Battle at Garden's Gate (2021)

Awards

Fryderyk

!
|-
| 2019 || Anthem of the Peaceful Army || Best Foreign Album || 
| 

Grammy Awards

!
|-
| align="center" rowspan="4"| 2019
| Greta Van Fleet
| Best New Artist
| 
| align="center" rowspan="3"|
|-
| "Highway Tune"
| Best Rock Performance
| 
|-
| "Black Smoke Rising"
| Best Rock Song
| 
|-
| From the Fires
| Best Rock Album
| 
| 

iHeartRadio Music Awards

!
|-
| 2019
| "Safari Song"
| Rock Song of the Year
| 
| 

Loudwire Music Awards

!
|-
| 2017 || Greta Van Fleet || Best New Artist || 
|

References

External links

 
 Lava Records Greta Van Fleet profile

2012 establishments in Michigan
American blues rock musical groups
Grammy Award winners
Hard rock musical groups from Michigan
Lava Records artists
Musical groups established in 2012
People from Frankenmuth, Michigan
Republic Records artists
Sibling musical groups